The Prize of the Austrian Mathematical Society is the highest mathematics award in Austria. It is awarded every year by the Austrian Mathematical Society to a promising young mathematician for outstanding achievements. A substantial part of the work must have been performed in Austria. The recipient receives, in addition to a monetary reward, a medal showing Rudolf Inzinger. The prize was established in 1955 and is awarded since 1956.

See also 
 Awards and Prizes of the Austrian Mathematical Society (in german)
 List of mathematics awards

Mathematics awards
Awards established in 1955
1955 establishments in Austria